Reli may refer to:
 Reli people, an ethnic group of India
 Reli language, an Indo-Aryan language

See also 
 Rehli, a city in Madhya Pradesh, India
 Relli (disambiguation)
 Rely (disambiguation)
 Raili, a personal name